{{DISPLAYTITLE:C20H20O6}}
The molecular formula C20H20O6 (molar mass: 356.37 g/mol, exact mass: 356.1260 u) may refer to:

 Balanophonin, a neo-lignan
 Pluviatilol, a lignan

Molecular formulas